Chris Willenken (born October 30, 1975) is an American bridge player.

Born in New York City, Willenken graduated from Collegiate School in 1993 and Williams College in 1997.  While at Williams, Willenken competed in the American Parliamentary Debate Association; he and Amanda Amert earned Team of The Year honors as the most successful partnership of the 1996-1997 season.

Willenken is an American Contract Bridge League Grand Life Master and a World Bridge Federation Life Master. In 2011, he won the gold medal at the inaugural Sport Accord World Mind Games Individual Championship.  In World Bridge Federation competition, Willenken reached the finals of the 2018 and 2021 World Mixed Team Championships.

Bridge accomplishments

Wins
 North American Bridge Championships (6)
 Fast Open Pairs (2) 2000, 2005 
 Wernher Open Pairs (1) 2001 
 Jacoby Open Swiss Teams (1) 2004 
 Chicago Mixed Board-a-Match (1) 2008 
 Vanderbilt Knockout Teams (1) 2022 

 SportAccord World Mind Games
 Open Individual Championship (1) 2011 

 United States Bridge Championships
  Open Team Trials (1) 2013

Runners-up
 North American Bridge Championships (8)
 Fast Open Pairs (1) 2002 
 North American Pairs (2) 2004, 2007 
 Grand National Teams (1) 2007 
 Jacoby Open Swiss Teams (1) 2014 
 Roth Open Swiss Teams (2) 2011, 2013 
 Spingold (1) 2018 
 United States Bridge Championships
  Open Team Trials (1) 2016

References

External links
 

1975 births
American contract bridge players
Williams College alumni
Living people